John W. Niddrie (September 24, 1863 – May 4, 1940) was a Canadian pioneer and missionary during the early years of the European colonization of Canada. He moved to Canada from Scotland. His memoirs were collected in a book titled Niddrie of the North-West. University of Alberta Press published the book.

External links
John Niddrie
Niddrie of the North-West : memoirs of a pioneer Canadian missionary on the Internet Archive

1863 births
1940 deaths
Canadian Methodist missionaries
Scottish Methodist missionaries
Scottish emigrants to Canada
Methodist missionaries in Canada